Malta participated in the Eurovision Song Contest 2015 with the song "Warrior" written by Elton Zarb and Matt Muxu Mercieca. The song was performed by Amber. The Maltese entry for the 2015 contest in Vienna, Austria was selected through the national final Malta Eurovision Song Contest 2015, organised by the Maltese broadcaster Public Broadcasting Services (PBS). The competition consisted of a semi-final round and a final, held on 21 and 22 November 2014, respectively, where "Warrior" performed by Amber eventually emerged as the winning entry after scoring the most points from a five-member jury and a public televote.

Malta was drawn to compete in the second semi-final of the Eurovision Song Contest which took place on 21 May 2015. Performing during the show in position 5, "Warrior" was not announced among the top 10 entries of the first semi-final and therefore did not qualify to compete in the final on 23 May. It was later revealed that Malta placed eleventh out of the 17 participating countries in the semi-final with 43 points.

Background 

Prior to the 2015 contest, Malta had participated in the Eurovision Song Contest twenty-seven times since its first entry in 1971. Malta briefly competed in the Eurovision Song Contest in the 1970s before withdrawing for sixteen years. The country had, to this point, competed in every contest since returning in 1991. Malta's best placing in the contest thus far was second, which it achieved on two occasions: in 2002 with the song "7th Wonder" performed by Ira Losco and in the 2005 contest with the song "Angel" performed by Chiara. In the 2014 edition, Malta qualified to the final and placed 23rd with the song "Coming Home" performed by Firelight.

For the 2015 contest, the Maltese national broadcaster, Public Broadcasting Services (PBS), broadcast the event within Malta and organised the selection process for the nation's entry. PBS confirmed their intentions to participate at it on 11 July 2014. Malta selected their entry consistently through a national final procedure, a method that was continued for their 2015 participation. On 14 July 2014, PBS announced that the national final would take place one week after their hosting of the Junior Eurovision Song Contest 2014 on 15 November 2014, making use of the same venue and stage utilised for the junior contest.

Before Eurovision

Malta Eurovision Song Contest 2015 
Malta Eurovision Song Contest 2015 was the national final format developed by PBS to select the Maltese entry for the Eurovision Song Contest 2015. The competition consisted of a semi-final and final held on 21 and 22 November 2014, respectively, at the Malta Shipbuilding in Marsa. Both shows were hosted by Daniel Chircop and Lyona Xuereb Gatt and broadcast on Television Malta (TVM) as well on the broadcaster's website tvm.com.mt, while the final was also broadcast on the official Eurovision Song Contest website eurovision.tv.

Format 
The competition consisted of twenty songs competing in the semi-final on 21 November 2014 where the top fourteen entries qualified to compete in the final on 22 November 2014. Five judges evaluated the songs during the shows and each judge had an equal stake in the final result. The sixth set of votes were the results of the public televote, which had a weighting equal to the votes of a single judge. Ties in the final results were broken based on the entry which received the higher score from the judges. The five members of the jury that evaluated the entries during both the semi-final and final consisted of:

 Ola Melzig (Sweden) – Technical director of various Eurovision Song Contest and Junior Eurovision Song Contest events
 Francesco Biasia (Italy) – Fashion designer
 Gohar Gasparyan (Armenia) – Head of Delegation for Armenia at the Eurovision Song Contest
 Owen Galea (Malta) – News coordinator
 Adriana Zarb Adami (Malta) – Director of Bupa Malta

New rules and regulations for the competition allowed for the artist, author and composer of the winning entry to change parts of the winning song or the entire song for the Eurovision Song Contest.

Competing entries 
Artists and composers were able to submit their entries between 28 and 29 August 2014 to the PBS Creativity Hub in Gwardamanġa. Artists were also required to submit a cover version of another song along with their entry application. Songwriters from any nationality were able to submit songs as long as the artist were Maltese or possessed Maltese citizenship. Artists were able to submit as many songs as they wished, however, they could only compete with a maximum of two in the semi-final and one in the final. 2014 national final winner Firelight were unable to compete due to a rule that prevented the previous winner from competing in the following competition. 134 entries were received by the broadcaster. On 26 September 2014, PBS announced a shortlist of 48 entries that had progressed through the selection process. The twenty songs selected to compete in the semi-final were announced on the TVM programme Xarabank on 3 October 2014. In order to present the competing songs to the public, the semi-finalists filmed promotional videos for their entries which were released on 20 October 2014.

Among the selected competing artists were former Maltese Eurovision entrants Ludwig Galea (performing as part of the group Trilogy) who represented Malta in the 2004 contest, Glen Vella who represented Malta in the 2011 contest, and Gianluca Bezzina (performing as part of the group L-Aħwa) who represented Malta in the 2013 contest. Daniel Testa represented Malta in the Junior Eurovision Song Contest 2008. Among the songwriters, Boris Cezek, Paul Abela, Gerard James Borg and Philip Vella were all past writers of Maltese Eurovision entries. Alexander Rybak represented Norway and won the 2009 edition; Jan van Dijk co-wrote the Portuguese entry in 1990; Charlie Mason co-wrote the Italian entry in 2012 and the winning Austrian entry in 2014.

Semi-final
The semi-final took place on 21 November 2014. Twenty songs competed for fourteen qualifying spots in the final. The running order for the semi-final was announced on 28 October 2014. The show was opened with a guest performance by the 2014 Maltese Junior Eurovision entrant Federica Falzon performing "Diamonds".

Final
The final took place on 22 November 2014. The fourteen entries that qualified from the semi-final were performed again and the votes of a five-member jury panel (5/6) and the results of public televoting (1/6) determined the winner. The show was opened with a guest performance of "Rise Like a Phoenix" performed by Austria's Eurovision Song Contest 2014 winner Conchita Wurst, while the interval act featured further performances by Wurst performing "Heroes" as well as performances by local singer George Curmi and 2014 Maltese Eurovision entrants Firelight performing "Backdrop of Life", "Coming Home" and "Talk Dirty". After the votes from the jury panel and televote were combined, "Warrior" performed by Amber was the winner.

Preparation 
Following Amber's win at the Malta Eurovision Song Contest 2015, PBS announced that "Warrior" would undergo remastering for the Eurovision Song Contest. The composers of the song Elton Zarb and Matt Muxu Mercieca worked with Gordon Bonello and Kevin Abela to produce the revamped version. A 57-piece orchestra was also used for the recording. The release of the song's new version and official music video was announced on 9 March 2015 at the PBS Creativity Hub in Gwardamanġa and made available online on the broadcaster's website tvm.com.mt and the official Eurovision Song Contest website eurovision.tv. The music video for the song was filmed earlier at a 400 year old abandoned house in Rabat, Malta.

At Eurovision 

According to Eurovision rules, all nations with the exceptions of the host country and the "Big Five" (France, Germany, Italy, Spain and the United Kingdom) are required to qualify from one of two semi-finals in order to compete for the final; the top ten countries from each semi-final progress to the final. In the 2015 contest, Australia also competed directly in the final as an invited guest nation. The European Broadcasting Union (EBU) split up the competing countries into five different pots based on voting patterns from previous contests, with countries with favourable voting histories put into the same pot. On 26 January 2015, a special allocation draw was held which placed each country into one of the two semi-finals, as well as which half of the show they would perform in. Malta was placed into the second semi-final, to be held on 21 May 2015, and was scheduled to perform in the first half of the show.

Once all the competing songs for the 2015 contest had been released, the running order for the semi-finals was decided by the shows' producers rather than through another draw, so that similar songs were not placed next to each other. Malta was set to perform in position 5, following the entry from Montenegro and before the entry from Norway.

All three shows were televised in Malta on TVM, with commentary by Corazon Mizzi. The Maltese spokesperson, who announced the Maltese votes during the final, was previous 2004 contest entrant Julie Zahra.

Semi-final

Amber took part in technical rehearsals on 13 and 16 May, followed by dress rehearsals on 20 and 21 May. This included the jury final where professional juries of each country, responsible for 50 percent of each country's vote, watched and voted on the competing entries.

The stage show featured Amber on stage alone in a long black dress with lace sleeves and a black ribbon around her waist. As the song progressed, the background LED screens transitioned between blue flame-like effects exploding outwards from a sphere and orange and red flames. The performance also utilised pyrotechnics in the form of shooting flames.

At the end of the show, Malta failed to qualify to the final and was not announced among the top ten nations. It was later revealed that Malta placed eleventh in the semi-final, receiving a total of 43 points—11 points shy of qualifying to the final.

Voting
Voting during the three shows consisted of 50 percent public televoting and 50 percent from a jury deliberation. The jury consisted of five music industry professionals who were citizens of the country they represent, with their names published before the contest to ensure transparency. This jury was asked to judge each contestant based on: vocal capacity; the stage performance; the song's composition and originality; and the overall impression by the act. In addition, no member of a national jury could be related in any way to any of the competing acts in such a way that they cannot vote impartially and independently. The individual rankings of each jury member were released shortly after the grand final.

Following the release of the full split voting by the EBU after the conclusion of the competition, it was revealed that Malta had placed twelfth with the public televote and fifth with the jury vote in the second semi-final. In the public vote, Malta scored 32 points, while with the jury vote, Malta scored 84 points.

Below is a breakdown of points awarded to Malta and awarded by Malta in the second semi-final and grand final of the contest, and the breakdown of the jury voting and televoting conducted during the two shows:

Points awarded to Malta

Points awarded by Malta

Detailed voting results
The following members comprised the Maltese jury:
 Howard Keith Debono (jury chairperson)producer, artist manager, event organizer
 Dorothy Bezzinateacher, singer
 Dominic Cinimusic producer
 Joseph Chetcutilawyer, violinist, presenter
 Pierre Cordinaradio presenter, club DJ

References 

2015
Countries in the Eurovision Song Contest 2015
Eurovision